are a J-pop duo formed in 2018. The duo was formed when its member, Itsuki, asked Narito to be his duo member when they had to perform at the event sponsored by the music school in Tokyo, where they both graduated. The duo was later discovered by the Japanese record label Being and made a contract with the company. In April 2020, they released the debut single "12cm", produced by Seiji Kameda.

Their debut extended play, Just Believe You (2020) reached number 20 on the Oricon Daily Albums chart. The extended play consists of the previously released singles: "12cm", "Hoshiai", and "Just Believe You". The latter two have served as the theme songs to the Japanese animated television series, Case Closed.

History 
In 2018, all at once was formed when Itsuki asked his classmate at the musical school, Narito, to be his musical partner. In 2019, they were discovered by a Japanese record label Being, and made a musical contract. In October 2019, they began posting music covers on Twitter. The cover of C&K song "Y" gained over one million views in less than two weeks. In November 2019, the duo served as an opening act for Mai Kuraki's 20th Anniversary Mai Kuraki Live Project 2019 "Let's Goal!: Barairo no Jinsei" ahead of the debut.

In April 2020, all at once released their debut single "12cm", produced by Seiji Kameda. The single was planned to be released both digitally and physically, however the release of CD single was cancelled as a result of COVID-19 pandemic. The B-side track of the single, "Take Mo' Chance" served as the theme song to the 2020 Japanese animated television series, A Destructive God Sits Next to Me. Their second single "Hoshiai" was released on 1 August 2020, and served as the theme song to the Japanese animated television series Case Closed. The song has been streamed more than two million times on the audio streaming platforms. The duo released their third single "Just Believe You" on 4 October 2020. The song was written by Mai Kuraki, Aika Ohno, and Giorgio Cancemi, and sampled Mai Kuraki song "Secret of My Heart" (2000). Their debut extended play Just Believe You was released on 27 January 2021. The physical version of extended play was released in two editions: standard edition and Case Closed edition. In January 2021, the duo announced that they would broadcast their first headlining concert, all at once Online Live ~Zero to One~ on 7 February 2021.

Discography

Studio albums

Extended plays

Singles

As lead artist

Music videos

References

Musical groups established in 2018
Japanese musical duos
Being Inc. artists
2018 establishments in Japan